Abdurahman Yousef (Arabic:عبد الرحمن يوسف; born 28 August 1993) is an Emirati footballer. He currently plays as a defender for Khor Fakkan.

External links

References

Emirati footballers
1993 births
Living people
Al-Wasl F.C. players
Al Ahli Club (Dubai) players
Al Dhafra FC players
Al-Nasr SC (Dubai) players
Khor Fakkan Sports Club players
Place of birth missing (living people)
UAE Pro League players
Association football defenders